Chondracris rosea is a species of large grasshopper in the family Cyrtacanthacridinae (tribe Cyrtacanthacridini); with a recorded distribution including: India, China, Indochina and Malaysia, Taiwan.

References

External links 
 

Acrididae